List of Mont-Saint-Michel abbey abbots, of the Benedict order, starting in 966 after the removal by Duke Richard I of Normandy of the previous order, present since 709, and originally funded by Saint Aubert of Avranches.

10th century 
 966 - 991 : Maynard I, 26th abbot of the Fontenelle then first Benedict abbot of the Mont;
 991 - 1009 : Maynard II, nephew of his predecessor.

11th century 
 1009 - 1017 : Hildebert I, nominated by his predecessor
 1017 - 1023 : Hildebert II, nephew of his predecessor
 1024 - 1031 : Almod
 1031 - 1033 : Théodoric
 1033 - 1048 : Suppo, previous abbot of Fruttuaria (Italy), brother of his predecessor and nephew of Guillaume de Volpiano, abbot of Fécamp
 1048 - 1060 : Raoul de Beaumont, monk of Fécamp
 1063 - 1085 : Ranulphe de Bayeux
 1085 - 1102 : Roger I, monk of Caen, former chaplain of Guillaume le Conquérant

12th century 
 1106 - 1122 : Roger II
 1125 - 1131 : Richard de Mère
 1131 - 1149 : Bernard du Bec
 1149 - 1150 : Geoffroy
 1151 - 1152 : Richard de La Mouche
 1152 - 1154 : Robert Hardy
 1154 - 1186 : Robert of Torigni, aka « Robert of the Mont »
 1186 - 1191 : Martin de Furmendi

13th century 
 1191 - 1212 : Jordan du Mont
 1212 - 1218 : Raoul des Isles
 1218 - 1223 : Thomas des Chambres
 1225 - 1236 : Raoul de Villedieu
 1236 - 1264 : Richard Turstin
 1264 - 1271 : Nicolas Alexandre
 1271 - 1279 : Nicolas-François Famigot
 1279 - 1280 : Ranulphe du Bourgay
 1280 - 1298 : Jean Le Faë

14th century 
 1299 - 1314 : Guillaume du Château
 1314 - 1334 : Jean de La Porte
 1334 - 1362 : Nicolas Le Vitrier
 1363 - 1386 : Geoffroy de Servon
 1386 - 1410 : Pierre Le Roy, former abbot of Saint-Taurin d'Évreux, and of Lessay

15th century 
 1410 - 1444 : Robert Jollivet
 1444 - 1483 : Guillaume d'Estouteville
 1483 - 1499 : André Laure

16th century 
 1499 - 1510 : Guillaume de Lamps
 1510 - 1513 : Guérin Laure
 1515 - 1523 : Jean de Lamps
 1524 - 1543 : Jean Le Veneur
 1543 - 1558 : Jacques d'Annebault
 1558 - 1570 : François Le Roux d'Anort
 1570 - 1587 : Arthur de Cossé-Brissac

17th century 
 1588 - 1615 : François de Joyeuse
 1615 - 1641 : Henri of Guise, Duke of Guise
 1641 - 1643 : Jean Ruzé d'Effiat
 1644 - 1670 : Jacques de Souvré
 1670 - 1703 : Étienne Texier d'Hautefeuille

18th century 
 1703 - 1718 : Jean-Frédéric Karq de Bebembourg
 1721 - 1766 : Charles-Maurice de Broglie
 1766 - 1769 : Étienne-Charles de Loménie de Brienne
 1788 - 1791 : Louis-Joseph de Montmorency-Laval

Further reading 
 Gallia christiana, t. XI, pars Abrincensis, col. 510-533.
 Fulgence Girard, Histoire géologique, archéologique et pittoresque de Mont Saint-Michel, Avranches, E. Tostain, 1843, p. 152.

See also 
 Mont Saint Michel Abbey

French Benedictines
People from Manche
Lists of abbots